Arrow Electronics is an American Fortune 500 company headquartered in Centennial, Colorado. The company specializes in distribution and value added services relating to electronic components and computer products. The company was ranked No. 104 in the 2022 Fortune 500 list of the largest United States corporations by total revenue.

History 
Arrow Electronics was founded in 1935 when a retail store named Arrow Radio opened on Cortlandt Street in the heart of lower Manhattan's "Radio Row," the birthplace of electronics distribution. Arrow Radio, established by Maurice ("Murray") Goldberg, sold used radios and radio parts to retail customers. Other industry pioneers with businesses nearby were Charles Avnet and Seymour Schweber.

By the 1940s, Arrow was selling new radios—manufactured by RCA, GE, and Philco—and other home entertainment products, as well as surplus radio parts that were retailed over-the-counter in a parts department at the back of the store. Soon the firm started seeking franchises to sell new parts; the first manufacturers to franchise Arrow were RCA and Cornell Dubilier. The business was incorporated as Arrow Electronics, Inc. in 1946.

In the early 1950s, with additional franchises and a small field sales organization, Arrow began selling electronic parts to industrial customers. A second storefront/sales office was opened in Mineola, Long Island in 1956. By 1961, when the company completed its initial public offering and listed its shares on the American Stock Exchange, total sales amounted to $4 million, over half of which came from the industrial sales division, with the remainder from the traditional retail business. During the 1960s, Arrow moved its headquarters to Farmingdale, New York (Long Island), and opened additional branches in Norwalk, Connecticut and Totowa, New Jersey. The company relocated its headquarters office to Centennial, Colorado in 2011.

In 1968, Glenn, Green & Waddell, a partnership formed by three recent graduates of the Harvard Business School, B. Duke Glenn, Jr., Roger E. Green, and John C. Waddell, led a private investor group that acquired the controlling interest in Arrow. The investors saw an opportunity to consolidate the fragmented electronics industry.  Duke Glenn served as chairman.

1970s 
Entering the 1970s with $9 million of annual distribution sales, Arrow ranked no. 12 among U.S. electronics distributors. No. 1-ranked Avnet was 8-times Arrow's size.

During the ’70s decade, by winning key semiconductor franchises (led by Texas Instruments in 1970) and opening sales offices in over 20 U.S. cities, Arrow grew its electronics distribution business at an average annual rate of 34 percent. By the end of the decade, the company's electronics distribution sales had climbed to $177 million, making Arrow the country's second largest electronics distributor.

The company took on high levels of debt through frequent public bond offerings, to fund its growth strategy. Additional growth capital was provided through the 1969 acquisition of Schuylkill Metals Corporation, a lead recycling company. (This business, having served its purpose, was sold in 1987 amidst problems associated with being designated an EPA Superfund site contaminated with lead and chromium.)

In the 1970s, Arrow discontinued its retail operations and inaugurated the electronics distribution's first integrated on-line, real-time computer system to provide up-to-the-minute inventory positions and facilitate remote order entry. In 1979, Arrow was listed on the New York Stock Exchange. That same year, it acquired Cramer Electronics (historically the U.S.’s second-largest distributor), the company's first major industry acquisition, which provided access to many markets in the western United States.

1980s to present 
On December 4, 1980, a fire in a Harrison, New York, hotel conference center killed 13 members of Arrow's senior management, including Glenn and Green. Waddell assumed leadership and, in 1982, recruited Stephen P. Kaufman, formerly a partner of McKinsey & Company, to join Arrow as President of the company's Electronics Distribution Division. Kaufman succeeded Waddell as CEO in 1986 and as chairman in 1994.

In 1988, Arrow adopted a growth strategy by acquiring Kierulff Electronics. According to Forbes, the company closed down all four Kierulff Electronics warehouses and within a year it experienced "miraculous" growth that went from a bottom line of $16 million loss in 1987 to operating profits of $10 million.

During his nearly two decades with Arrow, Kaufman led the company's consolidation of the U.S. electronics distribution industry as well as the company's expansion into Europe and the Asia-Pacific region. Under Kaufman's leadership, Arrow completed over 50 acquisitions of electronics distributors, including such prominent names as Ducommun (Kierulff), Lex (Schweber), Zeus, Anthem, Bell, and Wyle (all in the U.S.), Spoerle (Germany), Silverstar (Italy), and CAL (Hong Kong and China). Kaufman also led the company into the national distribution of commercial computer products, initially through its acquisition of Gates/FA Distributing. Arrow entered the 21st century with global sales of $9 billion—$6 billion of electronic components and $3 billion of computer products.

Kaufman stepped down as CEO in 2000, retired as chairman in 2002, and was succeeded by Daniel W. Duval, a 15-year Arrow board veteran. In 2003, William E. Mitchell, former President of the Global Services Division of Solectron Corporation, joined Arrow as chief executive officer and, in 2006, became chairman. During Mitchell's six years at Arrow, sales climbed to $17 billion as the company increased shareholder returns, improved operating efficiencies, and completed 17 acquisitions.

In 2009, Michael J. Long succeeded Mitchell as CEO, and in 2010 took over as chairman. A long-time Arrow executive, Long joined the company in 1991 through the merger with Schweber Electronics and served in various senior management positions before becoming CEO. During Long's tenure, Arrow completed over 40 strategic acquisitions that further expanded its global components and computer systems businesses. In 2015, Arrow acquired United Technical Publishing from Hearst, adding properties such as Electronic Products and Schematics.com. In June 2016, UBM reached agreement to divest its electronics media portfolio to an affiliate of Arrow Electronics Inc. for a cash consideration of $23.5m. The portfolio comprises the US and Asian versions of EE Times, EDN, ESM, Embedded, EBN, TechOnline and Datasheets.com.

In June 2022, Sean J. Kerins succeeded Long as president and CEO, and Long was appointed executive chairman of the board of directors. Having joined Arrow in 2007 as vice president of North America storage and networking, Kerins went on to serve as president of the company’s North America enterprise computing solutions business before being named global president of the business in 2014 and then chief operating officer in 2020.

The company was ranked No. 104 in the 2022 Fortune 500 list of the largest United States corporations by total revenue.

Recent acquisitions

Notes and references

See also 

 Competitor Tech Data
 Competitor CDW
 Competitor Synnex

External links 
 
 Official web site

Companies based in Centennial, Colorado
Electronics companies established in 1935
Business services companies established in 1935
1935 establishments in New York City
Distribution companies of the United States
Companies listed on the New York Stock Exchange
Electronic component distributors
1960s initial public offerings